The Dixie International Championships  or the Dixie Championships or the Dixie International was a men's and women's international tennis tournament established in 1925 and was played on outdoor clay courts at the Davis Islands Tennis Club, Davis Islands, Tampa, Florida, United States until 1968. It was part of the South Florida-Caribbean tennis circuit during the 1960s.

History
The Dixie International Championshipswere founded in 1925. The championships were last played on clay courts at the  Davis Tennis Club, Davis Islands, Tampa, Florida, United States. The tournament was part Caribbean Circuit during the 1960s, which was a major feature of the international tennis scene from the 1930s to early 1970s.

Finals

Men's Singles
Incomplete roll
Results included:

Women's Singles
Incomplete roll(* Final held indoors)

References

Clay court tennis tournaments
Defunct tennis tournaments in the United States